Mark Adrian Collett (born October 1980) is a British neo-Nazi, anti-semitic conspiracy theorist and political activist. He was formerly chairman of the Young BNP, the youth division of the British National Party (BNP), and was director of publicity for the party.

Collett first drew media attention after his appearance in a 2002 British TV documentary, where, in his role as a representative of the BNP, he made statements celebrating the death of Africans and homosexuals from HIV-AIDS, specifically referring to them as "AIDS monkeys". After the documentary was aired on Channel 4, resulting in negative publicity for the BNP, Collett was temporarily expelled from the party. He later rejoined the BNP, until his membership was suspended in 2010, following an internal conflict with party leadership. 

Since 2010, Collett has concentrated on his online political commentary, in which he promotes white supremacy, neo-Nazism, and conspiracy theories about Jews. In 2019, Collett founded a white nationalist group called Patriotic Alternative.
In 2020, he was suspended from Twitter.

Early life and education
From Rothley, Collett was educated at Loughborough Grammar School and the University of Leeds where he received a lower second-class honours degree in business economics.

Media appearances

Channel 4 documentary
Collett featured in a Channel 4 documentary on the BNP - Young, Nazi and Proud - broadcast in 2002 which concentrated almost exclusively on Collett. He declared his admiration for Adolf Hitler and said that he considered AIDS a "friendly disease because blacks, drug users and gays have it", unaware he was being recorded. Collett made similar remarks while on  Russell Brand's 2002 TV show RE:Brand, in which he described homosexuals as "AIDS Monkeys", "bum bandits" and "faggots". Collett was sacked from his position in the party and expelled days after the Channel 4 documentary was broadcast, although party leaders continued to share speaking platforms with him. However he was allowed to rejoin a few days later with chairman Nick Griffin saying that he must change his views on the subject. Collett was the party's head of publicity and produced the party's monthly magazine Identity.

BBC documentary and subsequent trial
As a result of a police investigation into another documentary, BBC One's The Secret Agent, which in July 2004 broadcast secret footage of Collett making derogatory remarks about asylum seekers, whom he called "cockroaches", Collett, then aged 24, was bailed on race hate offences at Leeds magistrates' court on 7 April 2005 alongside party founder John Tyndall and party leader Nick Griffin.  The trial ended on 2 February 2006 after a jury acquitted Collett of two charges of using words or behaviour intended to stir up racial hatred, and two alternative charges of using words likely to stir up racial hatred. The jury failed to reach a verdict in respect of a further four charges.

The Crown Prosecution Service subsequently announced that Collett and Griffin would face a retrial on the remaining charges of using words or behaviour intended to stir up racial hatred. This retrial began at Leeds Crown Court on 1 November 2006 and he and Griffin were found not guilty.

Newsbeat interview
In October 2009, Collett and the BNP's record label executive Joseph Barber were interviewed on BBC Radio 1's Newsbeat bulletin, being introduced only as "Mark and Joey, two young guys who are members of the BNP". They said that the England international footballer Ashley Cole was not "ethnically British" due to having black heritage. An internal inquiry at the BBC criticised the interviewers for not identifying the pair by their full names and positions in the BNP, and for not sufficiently challenging their remarks about Cole.

Political activities

BNP leadership bid
In April 2010, Collett was sacked from his job as BNP publicity chief and suspended from the party for  being supportive of a leadership bid against Griffin, and was subsequently arrested by Humberside police, who questioned him over alleged threats to kill Griffin. Despite the reinstatement of Collett's party membership he did not stand for the party in the May 2010 general election. He had previously been selected as BNP candidate in Sheffield Brightside and Hillsborough, to challenge the then-Home Secretary David Blunkett.

Humberside Police did not bring charges against Collett over the allegations of threats to kill, formally dismissing them later in 2010.

Involvement in  EU referendum campaign, 2016
During the 2016 EU referendum campaign, Collett was seen campaigning for Vote Leave and was featured in news articles by daily newspapers, alongside his neo-Nazi partner Eva Van Housen. BBC News later reported that Vote Leave demanded Collett and Van Housen stop using their Brexit campaign materials.

Patriotic Alternative
In 2019, Collett formed a group called Patriotic Alternative, of which he is currently the leader. The Times revealed in October 2021 that Collett attended combat training with former members of the now-proscribed Neo-Nazi organisation National Action.

Political views
According to the Anti-Defamation League, Collett is a white supremacist with close ties to other white supremacists.

Elections contested

General elections

Local elections

See also
Jack Renshaw (terrorist)

References

1980 births
Living people
Alumni of the University of Leeds
National Front (UK) politicians
Anti-LGBT sentiment
Antisemitism in England
Anti-Zionism
British National Party politicians
Critics of Black Lives Matter
English neo-Nazis
People educated at Loughborough Grammar School
People from Rothley
Place of birth missing (living people)
Alt-right politicians in the United Kingdom
English conspiracy theorists